Tebing Tinggi is a state constituency in Perak, Malaysia, that has been represented in the Perak State Legislative Assembly.

Demographics

History

Polling districts
According to the federal gazette issued on 31 October 2022, the Tebing Tinggi constituency is divided into 12 polling districts.

Representation history

Election Results

References 

 

Perak state constituencies